The Contagious Diseases (Animals) Act 1878 (41 & 42 Vict c 74) was an Act of the Parliament of the United Kingdom passed by Benjamin Disraeli's Conservative government.

A select committee was appointed in 1877 to investigate animal diseases. The resulting Act established central rather than local control over all outbreaks of animal disease.

The agriculturist Jacob Wilson considered the Act "an undoubted benefit conferred upon the agricultural interest by the Conservative Government". It was opposed by the Radicals.

See also
Contagious Diseases (Animals) Act

References

Further reading
Lely, John Mounteney. "The Contagious Diseases (Animals) Act 1878". The Statutes of Practical Utility. (Chitty's Statutes). Fifth Edition. Sweet and Maxwell. Stevens and Sons. London. 1894. Volume 1. Title "Animals". Subtitle "Animals (Diseases)". Pages 18 to 56.
 Paterson, William (ed). "Contagious Diseases (Animals) Act, 1878". The Practical Statutes of the Session 1878. Law Times Office. London. 1878. Pages 347 to 397.
Philip Henry Bagenal. A Digest of the Contagious Diseases (Animals) Act, 1878, 41 & 42 Vict., c. 74: and of the Orders of the Lords Justices and Privy Council of Ireland, for bringing the same Into operation. To which is Appended the full Text of the Act and of the Orders in Council, a Summary of the Principal Statutes incorporated therewith, and a Copious Index, prepared especially for the working of the Act in Ireland. Alex Thom. Dublin. 1879. Reviewed at "Reviews" (1879) 13 Irish Law Times and Solicitors' Journal 401 (26 July).
Jonathan Spain, 'Free trade, protectionism and the 'food of the people': the Liberal opposition to the Cattle Diseases Bill of 1878', in Eugenio F. Biagini (ed.), Citizenship and Community: Liberals, Radicals and Collective Identities in the British Isles, 1865-1931 (Cambridge: Cambridge University Press, 1996), pp. 168–192.

United Kingdom Acts of Parliament 1878